A list of Portuguese films that were first released in 2002.

See also
2002 in Portugal

References

2002
Lists of 2002 films by country or language
2002 in Portugal